The 1863 Town of New Plymouth by-election was a by-election held  on 9 October in the  electorate during the 3rd New Zealand Parliament.

The by-election was caused by the resignation of the incumbent, Isaac Newton Watt.

He was replaced by Henry Hanson Turton.

Turton was the only nomination, so was declared elected unopposed.

References 

New Plymouth 1863
1863 elections in New Zealand
October 1863 events
Politics of Taranaki